Seaters is a privately owned marketing technology company, with headquarters in New York City. Seaters platform and app was created to address the prevalent problem of empty seats at events.

History

Based on his experience as a ticketing agent and familiarity with the empty seat problem, Jean-Sébastien Gosuin founded Smart Seats (later changed to Seaters) in August 2013 with Manu Jans and Dominique Snyers.

In 2014, Seaters raised $4 million from investors in the United States and Europe.

In 2015, Seaters was one of 17 companies in the inaugural group accepted by Le Tremplin, for its sports-related incubator in Paris.

In 2017, Seaters raised $3 million in fresh capital with participants including existing investors and new investors.

Overview

Seaters has a two part solution to the empty seat problem, which has been found to occur at virtually all sold-out events, at a rate of 2-10% vacant seats. Both parts involve aggregating demand for unused tickets in advance of an event, so tickets can be distributed easily when they become available, even at the last minute.

Seaters mobile app allows to join Fan Groups for preferred events that are sold out. Members of Fan Groups wait in a virtual queue for notification that a ticket is available for them to purchase. Seaters earns a 20% handling fee from each sale.

References

Ticket sales companies
Online retailers of the United States
Internet properties established in 2013
Privately held companies based in New York City